James R. Mead (c. 1861 – January 9, 1934) was a Connecticut state senator and judge.

His parents were Benjamin C. And Mary E. Ritch Mead.  He was born in Greenwich, Connecticut.  He married Elizabeth M. Stone, who survived him.  He served in both the Connecticut state senate (from the Twenty-Seventh District) and the Connecticut General Assembly.  He spent fourteen years in Greenwich as a judge.

References 

1860s births
1934 deaths
Connecticut state senators